The Rawagede massacre, was committed by the Royal Netherlands East Indies Army on 9 December 1947 in the village of Rawagede (now Balongsari in Rawamerta district, Karawang Regency, West Java). Forces of the Royal Netherlands East Indies Army were battling Indonesian Republican army fighters TNI and militia forces seeking independence for Indonesia. Almost all males from the village, amounting to 431 men according to most estimates, were killed by the Royal Netherlands East Indies Army, since the people of the village would not tell them where the Indonesian independence fighter  was hiding.

Background
The Dutch received international pressure following Operation Product, their first police action against the Indonesian Republican forces, which led Dutch Lt. Governor-General Van Mook to order a ceasefire on 5 August 1947. Despite the ongoing negotiations, the Dutch continued their campaign against the Indonesian army.

Massacre

On 9 December 1947, a day after the initiation of the Renville negotiation, the Dutch army consisting of some 100 conscripts, under command of Major Alphons Wijnen, attacked Rawagede village and raided houses. They had received the order 'to clean up' the village, but could not find members of the Indonesia army. This triggered them to force people to get out of their homes to be gathered in a field. Males above 15 years were ordered to stand side by side, and then questioned on the presence of Republic fighters.

On that day, the Dutch army executed 431 people of Rawagede; without legal inquiry, lawsuit or defense. The Dutch army in Rawagede have conducted what they referred to as a summary execution; an act which is clearly categorized as a warcrime which is murder of non-combatants.

Aftermath
This massacre was also known by The CGO. But the commission’ reaction was limited to ‘critic’ against the military action which they called "deliberate and ruthless", without further strict sanction due to human-rights abuse; let alone treating this massacre against innocent people as war crimes.

Although Dutch Army General Simon Hendrik Spoor recommended that the responsible officer, Major Alphons Wijnen, be prosecuted, no criminal investigation was started. A report from the United Nations published on 12 January 1948 called the killings "deliberate and merciless".

Legacy 
On 8 September 2008, 10 widows of victims of the massacre officially held the Netherlands responsible for the massacre. The state lawyer replied in a letter published on 24 November 2008, that the Netherlands "deeply regrets" the massacre, but that it believes the term for prosecution had expired. This has drawn some criticism among members of the States-General of the Netherlands, as well as among leading Dutch newspaper NRC Handelsblad, which argued in an editorial that there is no such thing as a statute of limitations on war crimes.

In December 2009, the 10 widows decided to sue the Dutch state in court. The court decided on 14 September 2011 that the crime, due to its extraordinary nature, is not subject to a statute of limitations, and thus held the Dutch state fully accountable for the damages caused. Following settlement negotiations with the Dutch State, the plaintiffs/widows of the men executed in Rawagedeh were awarded 20,000 euros each in compensation; the State furthermore agreed to extend its formal apologies for the massacre.

On 9 December 2011, the Dutch ambassador to Indonesia stated: "We remember the members of your families and those of your fellow villagers who died 64 years ago through the actions of the Dutch military... On behalf of the Dutch government, I apologize for the tragedy that took place." Only 9 relatives are still alive and will receive 20,000 euros ($27,000) compensation each, but there is no schedule for these payments.

The ruling of the judge also included that the Dutch state was responsible because it has the duty to defend its inhabitants, which also indicated that the area was part of the Dutch East Indies in contradiction of the Indonesian claim of 17 August 1945 as its date of independence.

On 10 July 2012, the massacre received public attention in Netherlands after de Volkskrant, published two photos of an execution. Those photos are the only images documentation of massacre conducted by Royal Netherlands East Indies Army.

See also
 Decision by the district court of The Hague (14 September 2011), 
 Kuta Reh massacre
 South Sulawesi campaign of 1946–1947
 Rengat massacre

References

Indonesian National Revolution
Conflicts in 1947
1947 in Indonesia
Massacres in 1947
Dutch war crimes
Massacres in Indonesia
Massacres of men
Dutch East Indies
Mass murder in 1947
December 1947 events in Asia
History of West Java
1947 murders in Indonesia
Violence against men in Asia